The Russon was a British microcar with a sporting appearance and built by Russon Cars Ltd in Eaton Bray, Stanbridge, Bedfordshire, between 1951 and 1952.

Brain-child of D.A. Russell, the editor of the Aeromodeller magazine and designed by Derek Currie the Russon was at first powered by a rear-mounted 197 cc JAP engine, but production cars used a larger 250 cc twin from Excelsior. Drive was to the rear wheels through a motorcycle-type 3-speed gearbox. The suspension was independent all round by coil springs, and the body was mounted on a tubular chassis frame.  and 65 mpg were claimed.

The alloy-panelled body was built on an ash frame in a traditional coachbuilders manner and was styled to look like a bit like a miniature Jaguar XK120.  There was said to be room for three people to sit side by side.  The car was killed by its high price of £491, for which a "normal" family saloon could be had, and less than 10 were made.

The assets of this company were acquired by Air Vice Marshal D.C.T. Bennett in preparation for his project, the Fairthorpe Cars.

See also
 List of car manufacturers of the United Kingdom

References

Microcars
Defunct motor vehicle manufacturers of England
Companies based in Bedfordshire

Cars introduced in 1951